Lloyd Roseville Crouse  (November 19, 1918 – April 28, 2007) was a Canadian businessman, politician and the 28th Lieutenant Governor of Nova Scotia.

Early life
Crouse was born in 1918 in Lunenburg, Nova Scotia. In his youth, Crouse established three fishing companies. During World War II, he served as a pilot with the Royal Canadian Air Force.

Political career
Crouse entered politics winning a seat in the House of Commons of Canada as the Progressive Conservative  Member of Parliament (MP) for Queens—Lunenburg, and was re-elected on ten successive occasions. (Beginning with the 1968 election his riding changed to South Shore.)

He chose not to run in the 1988 election, and a few months later was appointed as Lieutenant Governor of Nova Scotia. He retired from the position in 1994.

Awards and recognition

In 1985, in honour of his long political service, he was appointed to the Queen's Privy Council for Canada, entitling him to use the prenominal title "The Honourable". He received the Order of Nova Scotia in 2002.

Death
In 2007, he died at the age of 88 in his hometown of Lunenburg.

References

External links

1918 births
2007 deaths
Canadian people of German descent
Lieutenant Governors of Nova Scotia
Members of the King's Privy Council for Canada
Members of the House of Commons of Canada from Nova Scotia
Progressive Conservative Party of Canada MPs
Members of the Order of Nova Scotia
People from Lunenburg County, Nova Scotia
Canadian Lutherans
20th-century Lutherans
Royal Canadian Air Force personnel of World War II
Canadian World War II pilots